Hippostratus was an Indo-Greek king who ruled central and north-western Punjab and Pushkalavati. Bopearachchi dates Hippostratus to 65 to 55 BCE whereas R. C. Senior suggests 60 to 50 BCE.

Rule
In Bopearachchi's reconstruction Hippostratus came to power as the successor to Apollodotus II, in the western part of his kingdom, while  the weak Dionysius ascended to the throne in the eastern part. Senior assumes that the reigns of Apollodotus II and Hippostratos overlapped somewhat; in that case Hippostratus first ruled a kingdom situated to the west of Apollodotus' dominions.

Just like Apollodotus II, Hippostratus calls himself Soter, "Saviour", on all his coins, and on some coins he also assumes the title Basileos Megas, "Great King", which he inherited from Apollodotus II. This may support Senior's scenario that Hippostratus extended his kingdom after Apollodotus' death. The relationship between these two kings remains uncertain due to lack of sources. Hippostratos did not, however, use the symbol of standing Athena Alkidemos, which was common to all other kings thought to be related to Apollodotus II. The two kings share only one monogram.

The quantity and quality of the coinage of Hippostratus indicate a quite powerful king. Hippostratus seems to have fought rather successfully against the Indo-Scythian invaders, led by the Scythian king Azes I, but was ultimately defeated and became the last western Indo-Greek king.

Coinage
Hippostratus issued silver coins with a diademed portrait on the obverse, and three reverses. The first is the image of a king on prancing horse, a common type which was most frequently used by the earlier kings Antimachus II and Philoxenus. The second reverse also portrays a king on horseback, but the horse is walking and the king making a benediction gesture - this type resembles a rare type of Apollodotus II. The third is a standing goddess, perhaps Tyche.

Hippostratus struck several bronzes of types used by several kings:
Serpent-legged deity (as used by Telephus) / standing goddess.
Apollo/tripod (Apollodotus II, several earlier kings)
Sitting Zeus-Mithras / horse, reminiscent of coins of Hermaeus.

Overstrikes
Azes I overstruck several of Hippostratus' coins.

See also
 Indo-Greek Kingdom
 Greco-Buddhism
 Indo-Scythians

References
 The Greeks in Bactria and India, W.W. Tarn, Cambridge University Press

External links
Main coins of Hippostratos

Indo-Greek kings
1st-century BC rulers in Asia